Dierkes is a surname. Notable people with the surname include:

 Dominic Dierkes (born 1984), American actor, comedian and writer 
 Edward Dierkes (1886-1955), American amateur soccer player 
 Esther Dierkes (born 1990), German operatic, concert and lied soprano
 John Dierkes (1905-1975), American actor